Coleophora agathella is a moth of the family Coleophoridae that is endemic to Turkmenistan.

The larvae feed on the leaves of Acanthophyllus species.

References

External links

agathella
Moths of Asia
Endemic fauna of Turkmenistan
Moths described in 1992